Burning Up is the debut roots-style reggae album by Sizzla. It was released on September 5, 1995, on the Jamaican label RAS. All songs were written by Sizzla and produced by Philip "Fatis" Burrell.

Track listing

External links
 Sizzla website
 RAS records website

References

1995 debut albums
Sizzla albums